Myloslavska is a station on the Livoberezhna Line of the Kyiv Light Rail system. It was opened on May 26, 2000 and reopened after a significant modernization of the line on October 26, 2012.

Myloslavska is a terminus station of the Livoberezhna Line, and is located right after the Maryny Tsvetaievoi station. It is named after the Myloslavska Street in northeastern Kyiv's Troieschyna neighborhood.

At one point the Kyiv City authorities proposed creating the "Vulytsia Myloslavska" station of the Kyiv Metro's Livoberezhna Line, although that entire project was scrapped in favor of expanding the existing light rail system.

References

External links
 
 

Kyiv Light Rail stations
Railway stations opened in 2000
2000 establishments in Ukraine